The 1999 Catalan motorcycle Grand Prix was the sixth round of the 1999 Grand Prix motorcycle racing season. It took place on 20 June 1999 at the Circuit de Catalunya.

500 cc classification

250 cc classification

125 cc classification

Championship standings after the race (500cc)

Below are the standings for the top five riders and constructors after round six has concluded. 

Riders' Championship standings

Constructors' Championship standings

 Note: Only the top five positions are included for both sets of standings.

References

Catalan motorcycle Grand Prix
Catalan
Catalan Motorcycle Grand Prix
motorcycle